Foundation Asset Management AB is a Swedish foundation asset management company, founded by the three largest Wallenberg foundations in order to manage the assets of the foundations, by means of direct ownership as well as through management and consultancy agreements.  The administration of all the foundations and the donations of all the Wallenberg foundations is handled through a subsidiary. The Wallenberg foundations is an informal collective name for the twenty different foundations founded by the members of the Wallenberg family.

The largest Wallenberg foundations in order of net worth:

The Knut and Alice Wallenberg Foundation, founded 1917.
The Marianne and Marcus Wallenberg Foundation, founded 1963.
The Marcus and Amalia Wallenberg Foundation, founded 1960.

Largest holdings at 31 December 2013
Alfa Laval – heat exchanger company (6.0% stake, 6.0% voting rights)
Bergvik Skog – forest company (12.5% stake, 12.5% voting rights)
Höganäs – metal powders company (50.0% stake, 50.0% voting rights)
Investor – investment company (23.3% stake, 50.0% voting rights)
Saab – aviation and military technology (8.7% stake, 7.7% voting rights)
SAS – airline and hotel company (7.6% stake, 7.6% voting rights)
SEB – banking (1.5% stake, 0.8% voting rights)
SKF – bearing company (12.9% stake, 29.5% voting rights)
Stora Enso – pulp and paper manufacturer (10.2% stake, 27.2% voting rights)

References

External links
Official site

Companies related to the Wallenberg family
Foundations based in Sweden